
Daqiao ( unless otherwise noted) could refer to:

Elder Qiao ( 2nd century), one of the Qiao sisters who married the Han dynasty warlord Sun Ce

People's Republic of China

Towns
 Daqiao, Dingyuan County, in Dingyuan County, Anhui
 Daqiao, Fujian, in Gutian County, Fujian
 Daqiao, Gansu, in Xihe County, Gansu
 Daqiao, Maoming (笪桥), in Huazhou, Guangdong
 Daqiao, Renhua County, in Renhua County, Guangdong
 Daqiao, Ruyuan County, in Ruyuan Yao Autonomous County, Guangdong
 Daqiao, Binyang County, in Binyuan County, Guangxi
 Daqiao, Luchuan County, in Luchuan County, Guangxi
 Daqiao, Yancheng, in Yancheng, Jiangsu
 Daqiao, Yangzhou, in Yangzhou, Jiangsu
 Daqiao, Ganzhou, in Xinfeng County, Jiangxi
 Daqiao, Xiushui County, in Xiushui County, Jiangxi
 Daqiao, Dong'e County, in Dong'e County, Shandong
 Daqiao, Hejiang County, in Hejiang County, Sichuan
 Daqiao, Mianning County, in Mianning County, Sichuan
 Daqiao, Nanbu County, in Nanbu County, Sichuan
 Daqiao, Pingwu County, in Pingwu County, Sichuan
 Daqiao, Jiangshan, in Jiangshan, Zhejiang
 Daqiao, Jiaxing, in Jiaxing, Zhejiang

Townships 
Daqiao Township, Neixiang County, in Neixiang County, Henan
Daqiao Township, Weishi County, in Weishi County, Henan
Daqiao Yao Ethnic Township, in Lanshan County, Hunan
Daqiao Township, Jilin, in Dunhua, Jilin
Daqiao Township, Xinjiang, in Baicheng County, Xinjiang
Daqiao Township, Huize County, in Huize County, Yunnan
Daqiao Township, Shiping County, in Shiping County, Yunnan

Subdistricts 
Daqiao Subdistrict, Anqing, in Yixiu District, Anqing, Anhui
Daqiao Subdistrict, Zhangshu, in Zhangshu, Jiangxi
Daqiao Subdistrict, Jinan, in Jinan, Shandong
Daqiao Subdistrict, Shanghai, in Yangpu District, Shanghai

Taiwan
Daqiao, Tainan, in Yongkang District, Tainan